Dexter Jackson is the name of:
Dexter Jackson (bodybuilder) (born 1969), American bodybuilder
Dexter Jackson (safety) (born 1977), American football safety
Dexter Jackson (wide receiver) (born 1986), American football wide receiver
Dexter Jackson (linebacker) (born 1988), Arena football linebacker